Guáimaro Municipal Museum is located on Constitution Street in Guáimaro, Cuba. It was established on 10 April 1970.

The museum holds collections on history, weaponry, archeology and decorative arts.

See also 
 List of museums in Cuba

References 

Museums in Cuba
Buildings and structures in Camagüey Province
Museums established in 1970
1970 establishments in Cuba
20th-century architecture in Cuba